Oxyurichthys zeta is a species of goby. It is found in the Pacific Ocean from Japan, Palau, Indonesia, Papua New Guinea and the Solomon Islands.

References

zeta
Fish of the Pacific Ocean
Fish of Indonesia
Fish of Japan
Taxa named by Frank Lorenzo Pezold III
Taxa named by Helen K. Larson
Fish described in 2015